Cornelis Dekker may refer to:

Cornelis Bontekoe (1644?–1685), real surname Dekker, Dutch physician
Cornelis Gerritsz Decker (1618–1678), Dutch landscape painter
Cornelis Decker (historian) (1933–2012), Dutch historian
Cees Dekker (born 1959), Dutch scientist

See also
Dekker